The A12 motorway is a motorway in the Netherlands. The road connects the city of The Hague with the German border, near Zevenaar, and the German Autobahn BAB 3. On its way, it crosses three Dutch provinces: South Holland, Utrecht, and Gelderland.

European routes 

The A12 motorway runs along with parts of three major European routes:
 The European route E30 follows the A12 between interchange Prins Clausplein near The Hague, and interchange Lunetten, just southeast of the city of Utrecht.
 The European route E25 runs along the A12 between interchange Gouwe near Gouda, and interchange Oudenrijn, just southwest of Utrecht.
 The European route E35 follows the route of the A12 from interchange Oudenrijn towards the German border.

The A12 near The Hague 

The section of the A12 road within the city of The Hague (near exits 1, 2 and 3) is actually not a motorway, but a highway. This part of the road, known as the Utrechtsebaan, is too narrow to meet the Dutch requirements for a motorway (for example, it does not have a shoulder), and is therefore a highway with a maximum speed of 70 km/h.

To block local traffic from using this heavily congested part of the road, exits 2 through 4 are built as incomplete exits. These exits only feature westbound exits and eastbound entrances, so they can only be used by interlocal traffic. Local traffic is therefore forced to make use of the available local roads.

'Branding' controversy 

In 2008, a government programme on route branding, under an umbrella project in urban planning, put stickers on all streetlights of the A12, citing efforts to give it a "route 66-like" allure. This plan, dubbed the "" (rainbow route), received news coverage because of its alleged trivial results (stickers on streetlights) and high costs (€120 000).

Exit list

References 

Constituent roads of European route E30
Motorways in the Netherlands
Motorways in Gelderland
Motorways in South Holland
Motorways in Utrecht (province)
Transport in The Hague
Transport in Utrecht (city)